Novosergiyevka is the name of several rural localities in Russia:
Novosergiyevka, Kursk Oblast, a village in Titovsky Selsoviet of Shchigrovsky District of Kursk Oblast
Novosergiyevka, Leningrad Oblast, a village in Zanevskoye Settlement Municipal Formation of Vsevolozhsky District of Leningrad Oblast
Novosergiyevka, Novosergiyevsky District, Orenburg Oblast, a settlement in Novosergiyevsky Settlement Council of Novosergiyevsky District of Orenburg Oblast
Novosergiyevka, Tyulgansky District, Orenburg Oblast, a khutor in Gorodetsky Selsoviet of Tyulgansky District of Orenburg Oblast